Burkhard Jung (born 7 March 1958 in Siegen) is a German politician of the Social Democratic Party (SPD) who has been the 21st lord mayor (Oberbürgermeister) of Leipzig (Saxony) since March 29, 2006. In addition, he has been president of the Association of German Cities since 2019; he is the first representative of an East German city in that office.

Other activities

Corporate boards
 European Energy Exchange (EEX), Member of the Supervisory Board
 Leipzig Trade Fair, Chairman of the Supervisory Board
 Leipziger Versorgungs- und Verkehrsgesellschaft (LVV), Chairman of the Supervisory Board
 Mitteldeutsche Flughafen AG, Member of the Supervisory Board
 VNG – Verbundnetz Gas (EEX), Member of the Advisory Board
 Sachsen Bank, Member of the Supervisory Board (-2018)

Non-profit organizations
 Stiftung Forum Recht, Member of the Board of Trustees (since 2022)
 Business Forum of the Social Democratic Party of Germany, Member of the Political Advisory Board (since 2020)
 American Friends of the Gewandhaus Orchestra Leipzig, Member of the Board of Directors
 HHL Leipzig Graduate School of Management, Member of the Supervisory Board
 Leipzig University of Applied Sciences (HTWK), Member of the Board of Trustees
 Max Planck Institute for Mathematics in the Sciences, Member of the Board of Trustees
 Stiftung Lebendige Stadt, Member of the Board of Trustees

Personal life
From 1980 until their 2014 divorce, Jung was married to Juliane Kirchner. They have four children, including actress Alissa Jung.

He married Ayleena Wagner in 2016, and their daughter was born in 2018.

See also
List of Social Democratic Party of Germany politicians

References

1958 births
Living people
Mayors of Leipzig
Social Democratic Party of Germany politicians